The Nero Award is a literary award for excellence in the mystery genre presented by The Wolfe Pack, a society founded in 1978 to explore and celebrate the Nero Wolfe stories of Rex Stout. The Nero Award is presented annually at the Black Orchid Banquet, traditionally held on the first Saturday in December in New York City.

Winners

References

External links
 

Mystery and detective fiction awards
Nero Wolfe